Irish Socialist volunteers in the Spanish Civil War describes a grouping of IRA members and Irish Socialists who fought in support the cause of the Second Republic during the Spanish Civil War. These volunteers were taken from both Irish Republican and Unionist political backgrounds but were bonded through a Socialist and anti-clerical political philosophy. Many of the Irish Socialist volunteers who went to Spain later became known as the Connolly Column.

Background
Following the rejection of the socialist motion put to the IRA Army convention on 17 March 1934 at St. Stephen's Green, Dublin three leading IRA volunteers resigned their duties within the IRA; Frank Ryan, Staff Captain Peadar O'Donnell, and George Gilmore.

Then followed a meeting of the Republican Congress, a body composed of the disaffected members of the IRA who wanted Irish Republicanism to focus on achievement of its goals via the political ideals of Socialism. Held in Athlone on April 7 and 8 the focus of the initial meeting was to decide on the direction of the new body and it was decided that an annual Congress should be inaugurated beginning in September 1934.

Following this an IRA court martial took place with former Major-General Seán Russell and the Commanding Officers (OC.) of North Tipperary, Clonmel, and the Fourth Dublin Battalion presiding. Former Commandant General Michael Price and O'Donnell were found guilty in absentia on a charge of insubordination and dismissed from the organisation. Bobby Edwards, Ryan, and Gilmore were also court martialed. IRA members who had expressed support for the Congress were effectively "stood down" from active service in the IRA although they would have retained links to the organisation due to its make up and operational nature.

Republican Congress
Planning for Republican Congress continued, however, with a meeting being held in Rathmines town hall on September 29 — 30, 1934. From the outset schisms within the newly formed group were apparent. Michael Price, Roddy Connolly and his sister Nora Connolly called for a drive towards a Workers Republic and the formation of a Workers Republican Party. O'Donnell, Ryan, Gilmore, and Edwards put forward a resolution supporting a United Front of the working class and small farmers. The latter resolution was eventually carried by 99 votes to 84.

The Congress gradually fell apart by 1936 and its significance as a political group passed. It did however provide the framework through which recruitment of IRA volunteers to fight in Spain would take place.

Spain
With the outbreak of the Spanish Civil War, Peadar O'Donnell and then George Gilmore went to Spain on behalf of the Congress to report on proceedings, and returned enthusiastic supporters of the Spanish Republicans. Ryan was incensed at quasi-Fascist Eoin O'Duffy organising an Irish Brigade to fight with the Fascists, and in open letters to the papers criticised Cardinal MacRory for raising funds at church collections to support Franco. The Congress started publicising the Spanish Republican cause in public meetings.  Frank Ryan organized the first transports of Irish volunteers. The first men left Dublin, Belfast, and Rosslare ports in early December 1936 traveling through France and Britain to Spain.

Campaigning
The first Socialist volunteers saw action on the Cordoba front in December 1936. Approximately 135 men fought beside the French IXth Battalion and No.1 Company of the British Battalion. The objective was the town of Lopera and by the time the action was complete it had caused the death of nine in the Irish contingent. They were Frank Conroy (Kildare), Johnny Meehan (Galway), Henry Boner, Jim Foley, Tony Fox, Leo Green, Michael Nolan, Michael May, Tommy Wood (Dublin).

Training for the Socialist volunteers took place at Madrigueras (Albacete) alongside troops from the British Battalion. The two groups were not amalgamated,  and the Irish contingent was shortly moved to a base in the town of Villanueva de la Jara in January 1937 and part of the Irish voted to move over to the American Lincoln Battalion.

The next engagement the Irish were involved in was the Battle of Jarama following Franco's advance into the Jarama Valley in February 1937. Other campaigns the volunteers were involved included the 1938 advance on Gandesa and the decisive Battle of Ebro where they fought as part of the XV Brigade.

Demobilization
On demobilization of Republican forces the Irish contingent marched to Marsa, later Els Guiamets, and then the demobilization center in Ripoll.

Motivations
Other factors outside of anti-fascist political conviction and the charismatic urging of Ryan and O'Donnell cited by volunteers for fighting in Spain include:
a series of riots in Belfast in 1932 and 1935. The 1932 riots, labeled the "Outdoor Relief Riots" were seen by many working class Protestants as a reason to turn to the politics of Socialism. William Tumilson, a working class Protestant, volunteered to join the IRA in the Short Strand district and subsequently became involved in the politics of Republican Congress following the riots.
Harry Midgley, leader of the Northern Ireland Labour Party, supported the Spanish Republic, but this alienated most of his Catholic supporters.
sections of the Catholic Church's support of Generalísimo Francisco Franco also turned many to support the legitimate government.
media reporting of the bombing of Guernica in April 1937 and a perceived bias in pro-Francoist media reporting in the Irish and British media. Along with radio reports given by Frank Ryan on "Radio Madrid".
it was easier to form a "common front" against fascism abroad rather than against imperialism and unionism at home
events organized across Ireland, including the Ulster Hall in Belfast, in which Basque representatives encouraged participation
a continuation of the struggle that the Irish had been engaged in; Tumlinson was to write home shortly before his death on 14 March 1937:
"Still determined to stay here until fascism is completely crushed. Impossible to do other than continue on with the slogan of Cathal Brugha: "No Surrender"

Legacy
The heavy toll paid by the Republican side in terms of manpower and eventual defeat lead to the imprisonment of those who did not escape from Spain following the victory of the Francoists. While many Socialist and Republicans were able to escape on time, they returned to an Ireland which had undergone significant change in terms of restrictions placed on those sympathetic to the aims of the IRA.

Commemorations of the part Irish Republicans and Socialists played in the conflict are still held and a plaque honoring IRA volunteers from the Short Strand in Belfast is the site of annual ceremonies. The Connolly bookshop in Dublin keeps various items of memorabilia from the troops who fought.

Notable Socialist Irish volunteers in Spain

Ulster

Arthur Archibald - Belfast
Archie F Bailey - Belfast
Victor Barr - Belfast
William (Bill) Beattie - Shankill Road, Belfast. Killed in the Battle of Brunete on 25 July 1937.
William Black - Belfast
Edward G (Ted) Bourne - Belfast
Joe Boyd -  Ulsterville Avenue, Belfast. Paramedic in the Scottish Ambulance Unit.
Danny Boyle - Belfast. Killed in the Battle of Jarama, 1937.
Robert Boyle - Belfast
James Campbell - Derry
John Campbell - Belfast
James W Clarke - Belfast
John Coleman - Belfast
James C Domegan - Belfast
Alex Donegan - Belfast
Charles (Charlie) Donnelly - Dungannon, County Tyrone. Killed in the Battle of Jarama on 27 July 1937
John (Paddy) Donovan - Belfast
Hugh (Pat) Dooley - Belfast
William Falconer - Belfast
John (Jack) Flynn - Derry
Albert F (Willie) Fulton - Belfast
George F Gorman - Derry. Killed in the Battle of the Ebro, 1938
William John Haire - Lurgan, County Armagh
Pat Hall - Belfast
James Patrick Haughey - Lurgan, County Armagh
John Hugh Heeney - Belfast
Bill Henry - Old Lodge Road, Belfast. Killed in the Battle of Jarama, 1937.
James Isaac Hillen - Belfast
Hugh Stewart Hunter - Ballyclare, County Antrim/York Street, Belfast
William Keenan - Bangor, County Down
Joseph Kelly - Belfast
Thomas A Kerr - Belfast
Jim Lamour - Belfast
William P (Bill) Laughran - Belfast. Killed at the Battle of Brunete, 1937.
James Richard (Bill) Lord - Belfast
Joseph E Lowry - Belfast
James (or Joseph) Patrick Magill - Lurgan, County Armagh
Samuel Martin - Belfast
William Meeke - Bushmills, County Antrim
Andrew Molyneaux - Belfast
William A Morrison - Belfast
John Murphy - Derry
Patrick K (Paddy) Murphy - Belfast
Thomas (Tom) Murphy - Monaghan/Belfast
Basil Andrew (Ben) Murray - Aughnacloy, County Tyrone/Ballymacarrett, Belfast. Killed in the Battle of Aragon 1938
Joe Murray, County Antrim
Richard John McAleenan - Banbridge, County Down
Paddy McAllister - Belfast (fought with Canadian Mackenzie-Papineau Battalion)
Paddy "Roe" McLaughlin - Lecamey, Donegal
Eamon McGrotty - Derry
Fred McMahon - Belfast. Paramedic in the Scottish Ambulance Unit
Paddy O'Daire - Glenties, County Donegal
Willie O'Hanlon - Belfast
Dick O'Neill - Falls Road, Belfast
James Straney - Short Strand, Belfast - KIA Advance on Gandesa, Hill 481, 1938
William "Liam" Tumilson - Belfast - KIA Battle of Jarama Hill, 14 March 1937

Other regions of Ireland

Robert Boyle - Dublin
 George Brown - Kilkenny/Manchester. Killed In Action July 1937. 
Paul Burns
Paddy Cochrane - Dublin
Frank Conroy - Kildare
Kit Conway, Burncourt, Co. Tipperary - mortally wounded Battle of Jarama 12 February  1937 
Peter Daly - Monageer, County Wexford. Wounded in the Battle of Belchite (1937). Died on 5 September 1937.
Alec Digges
Eugene Downing - Dublin
Bob Doyle - Dublin
Frank Edwards - Waterford
Rev. Robert M. Hilliard -Killarney, County Kerry. Wounded at the Battle of Jarama and died on 22 February 1937.
Jackie Hunt - Waterford
Mike Lehane
Maurice Levitas - Dublin/London
Alan MacLarnon - Dublin
Jack Nalty - Ballygar, County Galway. Killed in the Battle of the Ebro on 23 September 1938.
Thomas O'Brien - Dublin
Peter O'Connor - Waterford.
Eddie O'Flaherty
Michael O'Riordan - Cork
Thomas Patten, County Mayo, killed in the Battle of Madrid, December 1936
Johnny Power
Paddy Power
Maurice 'Mossie' Quinlan, Waterford. KIA Jarama 17 February 1937
Frank Ryan

See also
Foreign involvement in the Spanish Civil War
Connolly Column
Abraham Lincoln Brigade - encompassing Ryan's command in the George Washington Battalion
Ireland and the Spanish Civil War
Irish Brigade (Spanish Civil War) - Irish volunteers who fought for Franco under the leadership of Eoin O'Duffy.
Ireland–Spain relations

Notes

References

1930s in Ireland
Foreign volunteers in the Spanish Civil War
Irish people of the Spanish Civil War
Lists of Irish people